Hua County or Huaxian is a county under the administration of Anyang City, in the north of Henan province, China.

Its predecessor administrative area Huazhou/Hua prefecture was first established in 596 during the Sui dynasty. In 606 it was named Yanzhou, and soon after as Dong commandery. In 618 it was combined with present Changyuan and Yanjin as Huazhou again. In 1372 it was demoted to a county. The name 'Hua' means 'slip', given because the city had many slipways.

Location
Hua County is located in the southmost part of Anyang. To its north lies Neihuang County, also in Anyang; to its east Puyang County in Puyang; to its south the counties of Changyuan and Fengqiu, both in Xinxiang; to its west Xinxiang's Yanjin County and Hebi's Xun County.

Administration
The county executive, legislature, and Basic People's Court are in Daokou, together with the CPC and PSB branches. Prior to 1949 the administrative center of Hua County was in Chengguan. Its current administrative subdivisions are:

3 subdistricts 

 Daokou Subdistrict
 Chengguan Subdistrict
Jinhe Subdistrict

8 towns

12 townships

Climate

In the news

On 10 September 2009, the Basic People's Court sentenced Wei Fazhao to death for his January drunk-driving killing of eight people and injuring of three.  It was the first death penalty given to a drunk driver anywhere in Henan.

Notable people
 Zhai Rang, peasant rebel leader founding Wagang Army during late Sui dynasty.
 Zhao Ziyang, former general secretary of Chinese communist party (CPC) and premier of China.
 Lu Huaishen, official of the Tang and Wuzhou dynasties.
 Li Wencheng (李文成), leader of Heavenly Principle Sect revolt in 1813
 Nie Yuanzi, leader of the Red Guards during the Cultural Revolution.
 Wu Lanying, national sport shooter of China.

Transport
 Huaxun railway station

Notes and references

County-level divisions of Henan
Anyang